Peter Steven Swanson (26 December 1946 – 26 October 2003) was a rugby union and rugby league footballer who represented  in rugby union.

Playing career

Rugby union
He did not play in any test matches for the Springboks and played in four tour matches scoring one try and one conversion.

Rugby league
In 1972 Swanson signed a contract to play rugby league with Penrith in Sydney, Australia. He played for Penrith for two seasons, 1973 and 1974.

See also
List of South Africa national rugby union players – Springbok no. 452
List of Penrith Panthers players

References

1946 births
2003 deaths
Golden Lions players
Penrith Panthers players
Rugby league centres
Rugby league players from Eastern Cape
Rugby union centres
Rugby union players from East London, Eastern Cape
South Africa international rugby union players
South African rugby league players
South African rugby union players